Jolgeh Rural District is a rural district (dehestan) in the Central District of Asadabad County, Hamadan Province, Iran. At the 2006 census, its population was 6,669, in 1,574 families. The rural district has 14 villages.

Demographics 
In 2000, of the 68 villages, 30 were populated by Kurds, 16 by Turkic people and one mixed Kurdish-Turkic village. About 65% of the rural district was estimated as being Kurdish, while the remaining 35% was Turcophone.

References 

Rural Districts of Hamadan Province
Asadabad County
Kurdish settlements in Iran